Gholamreza Shafeei (born 1951 in Marand, East Azerbaijan) is an Iranian politician, vice president of strategic monitoring and president of management and planning in the cabinet of Hassan Rouhani and former Ambassador of Iran to Russia.

Notes

References

Government ministers of Iran
People from Marand
Ambassadors of Iran to Russia
1951 births
Living people
Iranian diplomats
Executives of Construction Party politicians